Leanne Harrison (born 10 April 1958) is a retired tennis player from Australia who was a runner-up in doubles at the 1979 Australian Open.

Grand Slam finals

Doubles: 1 (1 runner-up)

References

External links
 
 

1958 births
Living people
Australian female tennis players
Tennis players from Melbourne
20th-century Australian women
People from Mount Evelyn, Victoria
Sportswomen from Victoria (Australia)